A referendum on the system of government was held in Nepal on 2 May 1980. Voters were offered the choice between a non-partisan panchayat system and a multi-party system. The panchayat system received a slim majority of 54.99%, whereas Multi-Party System only received 45.2% of the total votes. Voter turnout was 66.9%.

Background
With the backdrop of mass student protests against his rule in the spring of 1979, King Birendra made a public declaration on May 23, 1979, that a referendum with universal adult suffrage with secret vote would be held in which the people of Nepal would be able to choose between introducing a multiparty system or retain the non-party panchayat regime.

On 21 January 1980, King Birendra published the Referendum Rules, stating that after the referendum 'His Majesty shall make such provisions in the Constitution of Nepal as may deem necessary'.

Method of voting
Nepalese citizens aged 21 and above were eligible to vote. The voters would mark their choice by stamping either of two colours on the ballot paper, blue for the multiparty system and yellow for the non-party panchayat system. It was speculated at the time that the choice of colours had not been coincidental, since the yellow colour was associated with saintly religious qualities. There is no empirical evidence though, that the choice of colours affected the outcome of the vote.

Results

By region

By district 
The panchayat partyless system option got a majority in 54 out of the 75 districts of Nepal. The highest percentage of pro-panchayat votes was recorded in Dolpo (96.4%), the lowest in Bhaktapur (34.4%). The highest scores for the multiparty system option were recorded in Bhaktapur (65.6%), Udaipur (65.1%), Siraha (64%) and Bardiya (62.1%). In general, the multiparty system option performed better in areas with higher literacy levels.

The Hindu community was more or less evenly divided between the two options. The Muslim community is said to have voted predominantly in favour of the panchayat system. Ethnic groups like Tamang, Sherpa, Magar, Gurung and Kirati overwhelmingly supported the panchayat option, whilst the Tharu are said to have been predominantly in favour of the multiparty system.

References

1980 referendums
1980 elections in Nepal
1980 in Nepal
1980
History of Nepal (1951–2008)
May 1980 events in Asia